Accounting Today is a trade magazine servicing the public accounting profession in the United States. Started in 1987, it grew to a circulation of more than 30,000. The parent company of Accounting Today is SourceMedia. With over 400 employees Source Media is the publisher of more than 30 periodical brands including several major financial magazines. SourceMedia publications include American Banker, The Bond Buyer, Employee Benefit News, and Financial Planning.

Accounting Today is one of SourceMedia's flagship products, and in 2009 the company merged the brand with two of their other existing accounting titles, Accounting Technology and Practical Accountant. This increased the brand's print circulation to its current level, as of October 2012, of about 60,000.

Accounting Today's website is at accountingtoday.com. Accounting Today's web site tracks related accounting news and hosts the Accounting Today blog, Accounting Tomorrow.

See also 
Accounting
Certified Public Accountant

References

External links 
 WebCPA: Accounting Todays online Ezine
 SourceMedia: Accounting Todays parent company

Business magazines published in the United States
Accounting in the United States
Magazines established in 1987
Monthly magazines published in the United States
Magazines published in New York City